Alexandre Danilevski (born in 1957 in Saint Petersburg) is a Russian-born French composer, lutenist, vielle player, active in Metz, France. He is the artistic director of Syntagma, an early music ensemble noted in particular for interpretations of music by the trouvères, Italian composers from Trecento, and Russian and Ukrainian baroque composers.

In 2012 Danilevski was profiled in an hour-long program on the Dutch radio station Concertzender.

List of works

Piano solo
 Sonata N° 2 (1987) Sonata-Reminiscenza: In Memoriam Nikolai Medtner
 Sonata "1985. In Memoriam Charles Ives"
 Le Retour
 Piano Suite in g
 Raining on Kopenhagen;
 Sonates I and II;
 Night Music;
 Concerto for two pianos

Other instruments
 Sonata I for violin and piano;
 "Revelation" for cello solo, ed. by HH-Musikverlag: AD001
 Three Inventions for three melodic instruments
 Ricercars (7 pieces for recorder or flute solo – in print now: Edition Tre Fontane);
 "Tombeau de Messiaen" for organ, commissioned for the festival "La Route des Orgues";
 Dolce Suono for two recorders – ed. by Tre Fontane: ETF 2038
 "Antiphones – I" (1997 – in print Tre Fontane) and II
 Senza Titolo
 Organum for string orchestra;
 String Quartets I to X

For voice and instrumental ensemble
 Koanes, 2013
 Lauda 'Se mai per maraveglia'
 Oda an die Traurigkeit
 "Seven Words of Christ"
 Pietа for soprano and string quartet, recorder and organ ad libitum;

Recordings
A. Danilevski. Koanes. Fragments of Consciousness. Centaur Records, 2016 – ensemble Syntagma and ensemble SurPlus
A. Danilevski. The Uncertainty Principle, Carpe Diem, 2012 ("Lauda", "Oda an die Traurigkeit" – Syntagma, "Antiphones" – Flanders Recorder Quartet, "Révélation" – Larissa Groeneveld, cello)
"Journey to the Cedar Forest" from the ballet Enkidu and Gilgamesh

Early Music
"Johannes Ciconia and his time" Melodia 1998
"Russian Baroque Music" Pierre Vérany, 2002
"Touz esforciez /Trouvères en Lorraine", Pierre Vérany, 2004
"Gautier d'Epinal/Remembrance", Challenge,2008
"Stylems" (music from Trecento) Challenge, 2008
"Rosa e Orticha" (music from Trecento) Carpe Diem, 2011
"Songé .i. songe" (mediabook; songs and a Dit enté by Jehan de Lescurel, early 14th century) FacSimile, 2015
"Gesta Romanorum (mediabook; 13th – 14th centuries) FacSimile, 2018

Contemporary Music:
 A. Danilevski "The Uncertainty Principle', Carpe Diem, 2012
 A. Danilevski "Koans. Fragments of Consciousness'. Centaur, 2016

References

Alexandre Danilevski, composer's webpage
Tokafi: 15 questions to Alexandre Danilevski

External links

French classical composers
French male classical composers
Russian classical composers
Russian male classical composers
Composers for lute
Lutenists
20th-century classical composers
21st-century classical composers
Postmodern composers
1957 births
Living people
20th-century French composers
21st-century French composers
20th-century French male musicians
21st-century French male musicians